He Bingsong (1932 – 11 February 2019) was a Chinese legal scholar.

Life and career
He was born in 1932 in Guiping, Guangxi, Republic of China. He had four brothers. After graduating from Peking University in 1952, he taught at the China University of Political Science and Law. After the Cultural Revolution, he served as a lawyer in the trial of Lin Biao and the Gang of Four counter-revolutionary groups. 

On 1 February 2010, he was awarded the Legion of Honour by the French government.

He died in Beijing, aged 87.

References

1932 births
2019 deaths
People from Guigang
Peking University alumni
Academic staff of China University of Political Science and Law
Chinese legal scholars
20th-century Chinese lawyers
21st-century Chinese lawyers
Recipients of the Legion of Honour